Chrysoclystis morbosa is a moth in the  family Geometridae. It is found on Peninsular Malaysia and Borneo. The habitat consists of forests, including  lowland forests, alluvial forests and limestone forests.

References

Moths described in 1926
Eupitheciini